The 40th Military Airlift Squadron is an inactive United States Air Force unit. Its last assignment was to the 438th Military Airlift Wing, Military Airlift Command, stationed at McGuire Air Force Base, New Jersey.

It was inactivated on 4 March 1968.

History

The unit was activated as the 40th Ferrying (later, Transport) Squadron under Ferrying (later Air Transport) Command at Canton Island Airport, Gilbert Islands, in August 1942. It ferried various aircraft, including A-20s, B-17s, B-24s, B-25s, B-26s, P-38s, P-40s, C-46s, and C-47s, to destinations in the Pacific Theater. The squadron also provided a maintenance service for transient aircraft until inactivated on 30 September 1943.

It was reactivated in 1954 under Military Air Transport Service at Dover AFB, Delaware in 1954. The squadron flew very long range C-124 Globemaster intercontinental transport aircraft carrying passengers and cargo, throughout the MATS Atlantic Division, to Europe, Africa and the Middle East.

It was inactivated in 1960.

The squadron was reactivated again in 1962 at McGuire AFB, New Jersey and equipped with the C-135A/B jet transport. It carried cargo between the US and Vietnam until it was inactivated in 1968 when MAC C-135 operations came to an end.

Lineage
 Established as 40th Ferrying Squadron on 1 August 1942
 Activated on 17 August 1942
 Redesignated: 40th Transport Squadron on 1 March 1943
 Disbanded on 30 September 1943
 Established as 40th Air Transport Squadron, Heavy on 1 March 1954
 Activated on 8 March 1954
 Inactivated on 8 December 1960
 Redesignated as 40th Air Transport Squadron, Medium on 8 January 1962
 Redesignated as 40th Military Airlift Squadron on 8 January 1966
 Inactivated on 4 March 1968

Assignments
 25th Ferrying (later, 25th Transport) Group, 17 August 1942 – 30 September 1943
 1607th Air Transport Wing, 8 March 1954 – 8 December 1960
 1611th Air Transport Wing, 8 January 1962 – 8 January 1966
 438th Military Airlift Wing, 8 January 1966 – 4 March 1968

Stations
 Canton Island Airport, Kanton Island, Gilbert Islands, 17 Aug 1942 – 30 Sep 1943
 Dover AFB, Delaware, 8 March 1954 – 8 December 1960
 McGuire AFB, New Jersey, 8 January 1962 – 4 March 1968

Aircraft
 C-124C Globemaster II, 1954–1960
 C-130E Hercules, 1962–1968

References

 Mueller, Robert, Air Force Bases Volume I, Active Air Force Bases Within the United States of America on 17 September 1982, Office of Air Force History, 1989

040
Military units and formations in New Jersey